Liberalis may refer to:

 Gaius Salvius Liberalis (fiction), fictional character

People:
 Flavius Liberalis (fl. early 1st century CE), Roman politician
 Gaius Salvius Liberalis (history) (fl. 80s CE), Roman religious leader & government administrator
 Liberalis (died c. 121), Roman Balkan religious leader, a.k.a. Eleutherius of Eleutherius and Antia
 Antoninus Liberalis (fl. early 1st millennium), Greek scholar
 Liberalis of Treviso (died 400), Roman religious leader
 Saint Liberalis of Embrun (died 940), French religious leader

See also:
 Liberius (disambiguation)
 Liberalis of free spirit, generous, ‘freedom’